Preciado is a Spanish surname. Notable people with the surname include:

Ayrton Preciado (born 1994), Ecuadorian footballer
Carlos Preciado (born 1985), Colombian professional soccer player
Édison Preciado (born 1986), Ecuadorian footballer
Enrique Villa Preciado (born 1951), Mexican politician
Francesco Preciado de la Vega (1713–1789), Spanish-Italian painter in neoclassical style
Francisco Preciado (1713–1789), Spanish painter, active mainly in Italy
Francisco Preciado (dancer) in Ballet San Jose, ballet company in California
Gregory Preciado (born 1983), American soccer player
Harold Preciado (born 1994), Colombian professional footballer
Jaime Preciado of Pierce the Veil, American rock band from San Diego, California
Jonathan Romero Preciado (born 1986), Colombian boxer and Olympic bantamweight competitor
Jorge Luis Preciado (born 1972), Mexican politician affiliated with the PAN
Julio Preciado, banda singer based in Mazatlán, Sinaloa, Mexico
Léider Preciado (born 1977), Colombian football striker
Lenin Preciado (born 1993), Ecuadorian judoka
Leobardo Curiel Preciado (born 1947), Mexican politician
Manuel Preciado Rebolledo (1957–2012), Spanish footballer
María Rodríguez Preciado (born 1978), Mexican politician
Nativel Preciado (born 1948), Spanish journalist and writer
Paul B. Preciado, (born 1970), Spanish writer, philosopher and curator

See also
Preciado Bakish
Despreciado
Preci
Recado

Spanish-language surnames